Pseudorhaphitoma averina is a small sea snail, a marine gastropod mollusk in the family Mangeliidae.

Description
The length of the shell attains 6 mm, its diameter 2.75 mm.

(Original description) A stout, pure white little shell with an ovate-fusiform shape. It contains  7 whorls of which two in the protoconch. It has strong ribs (7 in the body whorl), crossed by alternate strong or thin lirae, and gemmuled at the points of junction. The ovate aperture is narrow. The incrassate outer lip and the columellar area are beautifully suffused with orange-yellow.

Distribution
This marine genus occurs off Pakistan

References

External links
 
 

averina
Gastropods described in 1901